State Road 345 (NM 345) is a  state highway in the US state of New Mexico. NM 345's southern terminus is at Central Avenue in Albuquerque, and the northern terminus is at St. Josephs Avenue in Albuquerque. NM 345 is concurrent with the central section of Unser Boulevard.

Major intersections

See also

References

345
Transportation in Bernalillo County, New Mexico
Transportation in Albuquerque, New Mexico